Corneille de Lyon (early 16th century – 8 November 1575 (buried)) was a Dutch painter of portraits who was active in Lyon, France, from 1533 until his death.  In France and the Netherlands he is also still known as Corneille de La Haye after his birthplace, The Hague.

Although he is well documented as the leading painter in this distinctively French style, because he never signed or dated his paintings very few identifiable works can be firmly traced as his, with the first one identified in 1962. Distinguishing his hand from the many other artists working in the same style is therefore extremely difficult, if not impossible; works tend to be attributed to him on grounds of quality alone.

Corneille's portraits are nearly miniature in scale, ranging from the size of a postcard to about 8" x 10". Corneille worked in oil paint on wood panels. The flesh areas are painted very thinly, while the greenish backgrounds are painted more thickly. Similarities with the work of Hans Holbein may point to the use of tracing frames by both painters. The Louvre in Paris and New York's Metropolitan Museum of Art are both good places to study Corneille's work, whilst versions of his Portrait of a Lady (said to be Anne Stuart, Maréchale d'Aubigny) are in the Louvre, Bristol and Versailles. The Metropolitan has a portrait in the Robert Lehman collection, and another in the Jack and Belle Linsky collection, as well as six other works, some of which are not always on view.  Boston's Museum of Fine Arts has two works by Corneille and the Indianapolis Museum of Art at Newfields has three works. His Portrait of an Unknown Gentleman has been in the Museum of Fine Arts of Lyon since 2014.

References

Further reading 
General studies
 
 
Additional studies
 
 
 
 
Reference works

External links

Biography
Fifteenth- to eighteenth-century European paintings: France, Central Europe, the Netherlands, Spain, and Great Britain, a collection catalog fully available online as a PDF, which contains material on Corneille de Lyon (cat. no. 5)

Dutch Renaissance painters
1500s births
1575 deaths
Artists from The Hague
French Renaissance painters